Ganna Volodymyrivna Bezsonova (born 29 July 1984) is a Ukrainian former individual rhythmic gymnast. She is one of the most decorated rhythmic gymnast of her generation. She is a two-time Olympic bronze medalist (2004 and 2008); a five-time medalist in the all-around competition of the World Championships: gold in 2007, silver in 2003 and 2005, bronze in 2001 and 2009; a four-time medalist in the all-around competition of the European Championships: silver in 2004 and 2008, bronze in 2002 and 2006; and a four-time medalist in the all-around competition of the Grand Prix Final: gold in 2003, silver in 2002 and 2005, bronze in 2004.

Personal life 
Bessonova's father is the Dynamo Kyiv football player Vladimir Bessonov. Her mother, Viktoria, is a former two-time World champion group rhythmic gymnast. She is the one that introduced her daughter to the sport.

After retiring, Bessonova coached girls at the Deriugins School. Her students include Yeva Meleshchuk.

Bessonova moved to the United States in 2017 and coaches girls in Florida.

Career 

Bessonova began training in rhythmic gymnastics at age five. Her mother preferred to see her daughter on the ballet stage; however, Bessonova decided on rhythmic gymnastics. She was coached by Albina Deriugina and her daughter Irina Deriugina at the Deriugins School in Kyiv. She is 1.74m (5'9").

In 1999, Bessonova was the youngest in the Ukrainian team during the 1999 World Championship in Osaka, Japan, yet she made such a good impression that the RG specialists wrote her name immediately as a future top gymnast. In the 2001 World Championships, Alina Kabaeva and her teammate Irina Tchachina who originally won gold and silver medal in all-around respectively tested positive to a banned diuretic (furosemide) and were stripped of their medals. Ukraine's Tamara Yerofeeva who originally won bronze was awarded the gold with Bulgaria's Simona Peycheva from 4th to taking the silver and Bessonova from 5th was awarded the bronze medal.

In 2002, Bessonova tested positive for norephedrine, a banned stimulant in March during a competition in Disneyland Paris Stadium by France and was banned for two months. Bessonova briefly competed as member of the Ukrainian Group. She and the Ukrainian Group won the gold medal in five Ribbons in New Orleans. She dominated the 2002 World Cup Final in Stuttgart in November, by winning the first place on the hoop, the rope and the clubs. After that Bessonova (aged 18) became a leader of the Ukrainian national team.

In 2003 in Budapest she won two World titles — the hoop event final edging out Alina Kabaeva (performing to music from Swan Lake) and the clubs final where she beat Irina Tchachina for the gold. Bessonova was very close to the all-around title but finished with the silver medal behind Russia's Alina Kabaeva after a drop during her ball routine. In 2003, she won three European gold medals — in hoop, clubs and ribbon event finals. She won three of four finals in the 2003 Grand Prix tournament in Kyiv.

In 2004, Bessonova won the all-around silver medal at the 2004 European Championships. She made her Olympic debut and won the bronze individual all-around medals at the 2004 Athens Olympics with a total score of 106.700 (ribbon 26.725, clubs 26.950, ball 26.525, hoop 26.500) behind two Russians, silver medalist Irina Tchachina and gold medalist Alina Kabaeva.

In 2005, Bessonova became a six-time silver medalist during 2005 World Championships in all-around, rope, ball, clubs and ribbon finals. She took four gold medals at the 2005 Universiade in Izmir, winning the all-around, rope, ball and clubs. She won the all-around bronze at the 2006 European Championships.

In 2007, Bessonova competed in a number of Grand Prix and World Cup Series. The year would also mark the start of a new challenge for Bessonova with rise of new Russian gymnast Evgenia Kanaeva. At the 2007 Corbeil-Essonnes World Cup, she won the silver medal behind Evgenia Kanaeva. She won all the gold medals in 2007 Summer Universiade beating Sessina and Kapranova. She became World champion at the 2007 World Championship in Patras, winning the all-around gold medal defeating Russians Vera Sessina and Olga Kapranova.

In 2008, Bessonova won all-around golds at the LA Lights, Deriugina Cup (Kyiv World Cup) and Miss Valentine Competitions, as well as the all-around silver at the European Championships in Torino behind Russian star Evgenia Kanaeva. At the 2008 World Cup events, Bessonova accumulated 15 medals. The year culminated in her all-around bronze medal at the 2008 Beijing Olympics with Kanaeva winning the gold medal and Belarus' Inna Zhukova taking the silver medal.

In 2009, Bessonova placed first in the all-around at the Kyiv World Cup and Deriugina Cup events, and also won bronze in the World and European Championships behind reigning Olympic champion Evgenia Kanaeva and Daria Kondakova. She competed at the 2009 Universiade in Belgrade and won four silver medals again behind Kanaeva. Bessonova finally completed her career in 2010 at the Deriugina Cup in Kyiv.

In 2013 Bessonova performed at the opening ceremony of the 2013 World Championships, in Kyiv, Ukraine.

Other professional and social activities

After completing her career in professional sports, Bessonova appeared in Ukrainian television projects. During the UEFA Euro 2012, she was a TV presenter, a commentator and a special correspondent in a Ukrainian sports TV channel.
Back in 2009 Bessonova took part in «Dancing for You» TV show, becoming the winner (partnered with Olexander Leshchenko).
After some time, she was a chief editor of Ukrainian edition of Pink magazine. Bessonova is also known as an active promoter of sports and healthy lifestyle among young people in Ukraine. She participated in numerous charity projects.

Routine music information

Detailed Olympic results

References

Literature
Bessonova's early years are described in the book National Olympic Committee of Ukraine for Rhythmic Gymnastics and Iryna Deriugina, Olexandra Tymoshenko, Olena Vitrychenko, Kateryna Serebryanska, Anna Bessonova (in Ukrainian) (Національний олімпійський комітет України про художню гімнастику та Ірину Дерюгіну, Олександру Тимошенко, Олену Вітриченко, Катерину Серебрянську, Анну Безсонову / текст: Григорія Палія та Олександра Мащенка; відповідальний редактор Олена Мовчан. — Київ : Грані-Т, 2010. — 112 с. — ).

Another story based on real events from Anna Bessonova's childhood is Absolute champion by Oles Ilchenko (in Ukrainian) (Ільченко, О. Абсолютний чемпіон / Олесь Ільченко. — Київ : Грані-Т, 2011. — 80 с. — ).

References 
 Anna Bessonova Official Web Site
 
 Rhythmic Gymnastics Results
 Anna Bessonova Athlete Card on Beijing Olympics 2008

External links

 
 
 
 
 

1984 births
Living people
Ukrainian rhythmic gymnasts
Gymnasts at the 2004 Summer Olympics
Gymnasts at the 2008 Summer Olympics
Deriugins Gymnasts
Doping cases in gymnastics
Ukrainian sportspeople in doping cases
Olympic gymnasts of Ukraine
Olympic bronze medalists for Ukraine
Gymnasts from Kyiv
Olympic medalists in gymnastics
Medalists at the 2008 Summer Olympics
Medalists at the 2004 Summer Olympics
Medalists at the Rhythmic Gymnastics World Championships
Medalists at the Rhythmic Gymnastics European Championships
World Games gold medalists
World Games silver medalists
World Games bronze medalists
Universiade medalists in gymnastics
Competitors at the 2009 World Games
Competitors at the 2005 World Games
Universiade gold medalists for Ukraine
Universiade silver medalists for Ukraine
Universiade bronze medalists for Ukraine
Medalists at the 2003 Summer Universiade
Medalists at the 2005 Summer Universiade
Medalists at the 2009 Summer Universiade
Recipients of the Honorary Diploma of the Cabinet of Ministers of Ukraine
21st-century Ukrainian women